Universiti Sains Malaysia ( 'Science University of Malaysia'; abbreviated as USM) is a public research university in Malaysia. Founded on 1 June 1969 as a statutory body with its own constitution, it is among the oldest institutes of higher learning in Northern Malaysia. It has three campuses: a main campus on the island of Penang, a health campus in Kelantan, and an engineering campus in Nibong Tebal. There is currently an overseas collaboration with KLE University, India offering the Doctor of Medicine (USM) undergraduate degree. USM plans to open a Global Campus (Kuala Lumpur Campus) in Kuala Lumpur Education City (KLCE).

With around 28,300 postgraduate and undergraduate students in 2009, USM is one of the largest universities in terms of enrollment in Malaysia. The number of lecturers is about 1,479, which leads to a student-lecturer ratio of around 19:1.

USM is the only Accelerated Programs for Excellence (APEX) government-funded autonomous university in Malaysia.

History

The idea of a university in Penang was first mooted by D. S. Ramanathan in 1959 in the State Assembly and later crystallised when he was nominated chairman of the Penang University Project committee. The acquisition of a piece of land in Sungai Ara was then followed by the ceremonial laying of the foundation stone by the then Prime Minister of Malaysia, Y.T.M Tunku Abdul Rahman Putra Al-Haj on 7 August 1967.

USM was established as a statutory body in 1969 as the second university in Malaysia. It was first known as the University of Penang. The university operated on borrowed premises at the Malayan Teachers' Training College at Gelugor. In 1971, it moved to its present 239-hectare site at Minden (formerly Minden Barracks of the British Far East Command) in Gelugor, 10 kilometres from the city of Georgetown.

Apart from the main campus, there are two other USM campuses: one at Kubang Kerian in Kelantan, known as the Health campus, and the other at Seri Ampangan, Nibong Tebal in Penang, known as the Engineering campus. The former houses the School of Medical Sciences, the School of Health Sciences and the School of Dental Sciences, while the latter houses the six engineering schools.

Universiti Sains Malaysia offers courses at undergraduate and postgraduate levels as well as conducting research in the fields of Pure Sciences, Applied Sciences, Pharmaceutical Sciences, Building Science and Technology, Social Sciences, Humanities and Education.

On 3 September 2008, the Ministry of Higher Education under Dato’ Seri Mohamed Khaled Nordin selected USM to implement the Accelerated Programme for Excellence (APEX), a fast track development programme created to enable institutions of higher education to be recognised as world class entities.

Logo 

The logo of Universiti Sains Malaysia consists of a coat of arms and a logotype.

Coat of arms 

The coat of arms of Universiti Sains Malaysia features a crescent moon and a fourteen-pointed federal star, two tigers holding palm fronds, a shield and a motto. The shield itself contains an open book, a pair of kris (Malay dagger) and the national flower – a Hibiscus rosa-sinensis flower.

It is blazoned:

Shield: Purpure in base a Hibiscus rosa-sinensis flower and in chief an open book superimposed on a pair of kris all proper.

Torse: Argent and OrangeCrest: A crescent and a fourteen-pointed federal star Or.

Supporters: Two tigers rampant both grasping a palm frond proper.

Motto: Kami Memimpin (We Lead in Malay)

The list of vice-chancellors of the Universiti Sains Malaysia

Organisation
The management of the university is carried out through the executive power of the Board of Directors, made up of members chosen from the university, representatives from government departments and those appointed by the Ministry of Higher Education. There are three Deputy Vice-Chancellors led by the Vice-Chancellor.

Ombudsman
In August 2011 USM created a new role of Ombudsman to deal with staff issues and protect whistleblowers.  The USM Ombudsman is Prof. Dato' Seri Dr. MD. Salleh Yaapar, who is a former staff of the USM and is on a rolling 2-year contract.

Chief Integrity Officer
In July 2012, following a presentation by the Chief of Malaysian Anti-Corruption Commission, the VC of USM promises to create a new role of Chief Integrity Officer to cultivate academic integrity among students, lecturers and staff.
The current Chief Integrity Officer is Dr. Khairul Anuar Che Azmi, the university's first ombudsman and is also the Legal Advisor.

 Mission & Vision 

 Mission 
Transforming Higher Education for a Sustainable Tomorrow

 Vision 
USM is a pioneering, transdisciplinary research intensive university that empowers future talents and enables the bottom billions to transform their socio-economic well-being.

 Value 
Quality, Equality, Availability, Accessibility, Affordability, Appropriateness

 Thrust 
Knowledge, The Future, Uniqueness, Sustainability, Humanity, Universality, Change, Sacrifice, Wellness

Academic programmes
Twenty four academic schools, 14 centres and 7 units have been established. Of the schools, 12 are applied science and technology-based schools: Civil Engineering, Aerospace Engineering; Chemical Engineering; Electrical and Electronic Engineering; Materials and Mineral Resources Engineering; Mechanical Engineering; Housing, Building and Planning; Industrial Technology; Medical Sciences; Dental Sciences; Health Sciences; and Pharmaceutical Sciences. The three liberal arts schools are Educational Studies, Humanities, and Social Sciences. The pure science schools are Biological Sciences, Chemical Sciences, Mathematical Sciences, Computer Sciences, and Physics, all of which offer courses that are similar to those available in other universities. There is offshore collaboration with KLE University, India offering the Doctor of Medicine(USM) undergraduate degree. This offshore five-year M.D. programme is conducted at the Jawaharlal Nehru Medical College (Belgaum), KLE University, Belgaum, India. In India, USM also has a collaboration with the James Lind Institute for conducting Translational Medicine programs.

In December 1989, the School of Management was set up, having evolved from the Management program within the School of Social Sciences. As part of its continuing expansion, the university established the School of Computer Sciences and the School of Communication as of March 1995.

In 2008, Professor Maqsudul Alam, set up the Centre for Chemical Biology (CCB) where he became its first Chief Executive Officer and Director, and sequenced the genome for rubber in Malaysia.

The centres and ancillary services include the Centre for Languages and Translation, the National Poison Centre, the Doping Control Centre, the Centre for Archaeological Research Malaysia, the Centre for Educational Technology and Multimedia, the Computer Centre, the Centre for Knowledge, Communication and Technology and the Islamic Centre. There are research centres, namely the Centre for Policy Research, the Centre for Drug Research and the Centre for Marine and Coastal Studies. The distance education program offered through the School of Distance Education was adopted by the university in 1971.

USM is one of five universities in Malaysia that have been identified as research-intensive universities, with the other being University of Malaya, Universiti Putra Malaysia, Universiti Teknologi Malaysia and Universiti Kebangsaan Malaysia.

 Campuses 
The Main campus has the name of a German city (Minden) because the campus was built on the territory of the former British Minden Barracks, which themselves were named after the Battle of Minden.

Besides the main campus in Minden, USM has one at Kubang Kerian in Kelantan known as Health Campus and another at Seri Ampangan, Nibong Tebal in mainland Penang known as Engineering Campus.

Started as a USM hospital in 1982, the Health campus has expanded after the School of Medical Science was moved from the main campus to the present site which is 73 hectares. The School of Medical Science was moved from the main campus in June 1984. There are two other schools in the health campus — the School of Dental Science and the School of Allied Health Sciences.

The Engineering Campus was originally located at Tronoh, Perak, and named Perak Branch Campus (KCP). After operating in the state for 15 years (1986–2001), the Engineering Campus moved to the present site in Nibong Tebal, Penang.

{
  "type": "ExternalData",
  "service": "geoshape",
  "ids": "Q1973130",
  "properties": {
    "title": "University of Science",
    "description": "Penang Main Campus",
  }
}

 Schools 
USM is the one of the Malaysian public universities to use the term school (in Malay; Pusat Pengajian) instead of the term faculty that is used in other Malaysian public universities.

Technology-based schools
All located at the Engineering Campus except the School of Housing, Building and Planning (main campus) and The School of Industrial Technology (main campus).
 School of Aerospace Engineering
 School of Civil Engineering
 School of Chemical Engineering
 School of Electrical & Electronic Engineering
 School of Materials and Mineral Resources Engineering
 School of Mechanical Engineering
 School of Housing, Building and Planning
 School of Industrial Technology

Liberal arts schools
All located at main campus, island of Penang.
 School of Arts
 School of Communication
 School of Educational Studies
 School of Humanities
 School of Social Sciences <http://www.soc.usm.my/>
 School of Management <https://som.usm.my/>
 School of Languages, Literacies and Translation <http://www.ppblt.usm.my/>

Science Schools
All located at main campus, island of Penang.
 School of Biological Sciences
 School of Chemical Sciences
 School of Mathematical Sciences
 School of Computer Sciences
 School of Physics

Health Science Schools
All located at Health Campus, Kelantan except The School of Pharmacy (located in main campus) and Advanced Medical and Dental Institute (located in Bertam outside Penang Island AMDI) which is more commonly referred to using its Malay acronym IPPT (Institut Perubatan dan Pergigian Termaju) Bertam.
 School of Medical Sciences
 School of Dental Sciences
 School of Health Sciences
 School of Pharmaceutical Sciences
 Advanced Medical and Dental Institute (AMDI)

 Research 

The Science Fund funding is the main source of R&D for USM. However, to promote research, the university allocates money from its operating funds annually as incentive and for short-term research purposes. External funds, mainly in the form of research grants, awards and consultancies won by individual academic staff members, also feature prominently. There are external sources of funding as well, but these are largely ad hoc and do not, as a rule, result in the development of major research facilities. Some external research links have been established through individual and through institutional networking arrangements.

 Research areas 
Research areas at USM include brain and neuroscience, environmental science, aquaculture, biomedical and pharmaceutical studies, natural language processing and computer aided translation, information technology, food technology, polymer science and technology,  biotechnology, distance education, geographical information system, structure analysis, materials science, engineering, surface chemistry, and robotic vision. Penang has research facilities for collaborative search, particularly in coastal pollution, mangrove ecosystem and marine aquaculture.

 Education 

 Graduate studies 

USM offers three modes of study for the graduate programmes, i.e., by research, by a combination of coursework and research (mixed mode), or by coursework. In 2009, there were 9,011 students in the master's and doctoral level programmes with 24.9% of them  nationals from more than 40 countries. The majority of the foreign students are from other parts of Southeast Asia as well as the Middle East.

 Undergraduate studies 
Almost all undergraduate degree programs at the university require a minimum full-time residence of three years. Degrees in engineering, health sciences, pharmacy, medicine and dentistry require minimum periods of study between four and five years. Most undergraduate courses are taught in English, especially in science courses, except for humanities and social science. International students have to demonstrate a level of proficiency in the national language as part of the entrance criteria. However they will be taught as one of compulsory subjects once they enroll as a student.

 Other study programmes 
USM has programmes for foreign students, and they can undertake one or two semesters. These students are considered full-time and enjoy the benefits of USM's academic and physical facilities.

The School of Distance Education was established in 1971 to provide opportunities for local working adults to obtain a tertiary qualification. These students are able to undertake undergraduate courses while they are in full-time employment. At present four undergraduate degree programmes are available through distance learning: Bachelor of Science, Bachelor of Social Science, Bachelor of Arts, and Bachelor of Management.

 Collaboration with Overseas Universities 
The University and the University of Indonesia (UI) collaborates with the Singapore University of Social Sciences (SUSS) on SUSS's BA Malay Language and Literature, University of Glasgow, Institute Technology Bandung (ITB) and many more to come.

Departments
Library of Universiti Sains Malaysia

Activities

USM has facilities for student accommodation, sporting and recreation. The university offers housing for approximately 75% of its students. They are known as student villages or hostels (Desasiswa in Malay), and they are on campus. Cafeterias can be found all around the university area.

USM provides sporting facilities such as archery range, cricket, football field, badminton courts, tennis courts, hockey ground, rugby field, softball, squash courts, and basketball courts. Its ground was used for the 2008 U/19 Cricket World Cup.

Other activities include cultural activities, leadership programs, community service programs and excellence programs with the co-operation of the Student Advisory and Development Unit, the Sports Unit, the Arts and Cultural Development Unit, Hostel Management. Activities are realised through societies, clubs, sports and cultural activities, motivation workshops and debate competitions. Among others, USM has a jazz orchestra called the USM Jazz Band that is composed of student musicians from various schools in the university.

There are annual activities such as forums, workshops and programs in conjunction with the National Day celebrations such as the Ambang Merdeka Night and the Merdeka Campus Walk, and religious activities such as Qur'an Recitation and Ramadhan Appreciation Month in the holy month of Ramadhan.

Hostels
The hostels known as student villages or (Desasiswa in Malay) under the property of the University of Science Malaysia are as follows:
Main Campus
 Aman Damai Fajar Harapan
 Bakti Permai Cahaya Gemilang
 Indah Kembara
 Restu
 Saujana
 Tekun

The names of the hostels indicate a merger between formerly separate hostels. For example, "Aman Damai Fajar Harapan" was formerly four separate hostels, each having its own administration under a hostel warden ("Penggawa" in Malay) and assistant warden.
Engineering Campus
 Jaya Lembaran Utama

Health Campus
 Murni Nurani

 Ranking 
The university was ranked 111th in the World University Rankings 2004 published by the Times Higher Education Supplement. However, it dropped out of the list of top 200 universities in the world in 2005.
In 2019, however, the University placed 601–800th in the World University rankings. It also placed 49th in University Impact Rankings and 151 – 200th in the Young University Rankings.
USM's then vice-chancellor Prof Tan Sri Dato' Dzulkifli Abdul Razak said that the addition of new criteria such as the employer survey could have contributed to the sharp drop in the university's integrity: "Our poor standing could also be attributed to the fact that we are a relatively young university compared to UM which is 100 years old. They have built up a stable reputation in that time." Prof. Dzulkifli also cited the poor staff-student ratio in Malaysian universities: "Over the past years we have doubled our intake. USM now has 35,000 students including 28,000 undergraduates but the number of lecturers, about 1,400 has not increased in tandem." 

On 3 September 2008, Universiti Sains Malaysia (USM) was declared the Apex (Accelerated Programme for Excellence) University by the Ministry of Higher Education of Malaysia. In 2010, USM achieved the position of 123 under the category of Life Sciences and Biomedicine (Times Higher Education QS World University Rankings).

For the 2010 QS Asian University rankings, USM was at 69th place. For particular subjects, the rankings were as below:

On 2015, USM was ranked 87th in Best Global Universities for Engineering of U.S. News & World Report College and University Ranking.

QS World University Rankings

 Notable alumni 

The alumni of Universiti Sains Malaysia include politicians such as Tun Seri Setia Haji Mohd Ali Mohd Rustam, current Yang di-Pertua Negeri of Malacca, Chow Kon Yeow, current Chief Minister of Penang, Dato' Sri Wan Rosdy Wan Ismail, current Menteri Besar of Pahang, Dato' Seri Haji Muhammad Sanusi Md Nor, current Menteri Besar of Kedah and Yusril Ihza Mahendra, current general chairman of the Indonesian Crescent Star Party.

 Movies and television 
Movies filmed on or near USM's campus include:
 Ali Setan (1985)
 Soalnya Siapa (2002)
 Vennira Iravuggal (2014)
 The Sleep Curse (2017)

Television shows have used USM's campus, including:
 Layang-layang terputus talinya Spektra''

Partner Institution

Australia
University of Adelaide
University of Western Australia
University of Queensland
University of New South Wales

Hong Kong
University of Hong Kong

Japan
Hokkaido University
Kyoto University
Tokyo University of Foreign Studies
Hiroshima University
University of Tsukuba
Doshisha University
Riken

Malaysia
Universiti Tunku Abdul Rahman

Singapore
National University of Singapore
Nanyang Technological University

Taiwan
National Taiwan University
National Chiao Tung University

References

External links

 Universiti Sains Malaysia
 Engineering campus
 Health campus
 MyUSMinfo
 IPv6 Centre of Excellence (NAv6)
 School of Languages, Literacies and Translation

Universities and colleges in Penang
Educational institutions established in 1969
Northern Corridor Economic Region

Art schools in Malaysia
Business schools in Malaysia
Design schools in Malaysia
Technical universities and colleges in Malaysia
Engineering universities and colleges in Malaysia
Information technology schools in Malaysia
Medical schools in Malaysia
Nursing schools in Malaysia
1969 establishments in Malaysia
Distance education institutions based in Malaysia